Lake Gregory, also known as the Isis Balancing Storage or simply as The Duckpond is a small impoundment between Bundaberg and Childers in Queensland, Australia completed in 1986. It is 1.67 square kilometres in area with an average depth of 3.1 m and holds 6160 ML. at full supply level

Fishing
Since 1991, lake has been stocked with 80,000 bass and 25,000 Silver Perch. Garfish and eel-tailed catfish occur naturally. Lake Gregory is the closest freshwater storage lake to Bundaberg and is surrounded by the Elliott State Forest. A Stocked Impoundment Permit is required to fish in the dam.

References

External links
A day at the duckpond

Dams in Queensland
Wide Bay–Burnett
Reservoirs in Queensland